Lelić is a village in the municipality of Valjevo, Serbia. According to the 2002 census, the village has a population of 568 people. Saint Nikolai Velimirovich of Ohrid and Žiča of the Serbian Orthodox Church is buried there, next to his parents and nephew.

Several historical Orthodox Christian monasteries are located near Lelić.

Gallery

Notable people 

 Nikolaj Velimirović, Serbian Orthodox Bishop
 Artemije Radosavljević, Serbian Orthodox Bishop
 Danial Jahić, Serbian long jumper

References

External links

Populated places in Kolubara District